The Aveyron is a 291 km long river in southern France, right tributary of the Tarn. It rises in the southern Massif Central, near Sévérac-le-Château.

In 1855 evidence of prehistoric man was found near Bruniquel under a hill called Montastruc. The hill was 98 foot high. The account said the overhang extended for about 46 feet along the river and the area enclosed was 298 square yards. Within this cave was found the 13,000-year-old sculpture called Swimming Reindeer.

Tributaries include

 Viaur
 Cérou
 Vère
 Alzou

Places along the river

The Aveyron flows west through the following départements and towns:
 Aveyron (named after the river): Rodez, Villefranche-de-Rouergue.
 Tarn.
 Tarn-et-Garonne.
 Bruniquel: a town north-east of Toulouse

It flows into the Tarn near Lafrançaise, north-west of Montauban.

References

Rivers of France
Rivers of Aveyron
Rivers of Tarn (department)
Rivers of Tarn-et-Garonne
Rivers of Occitania (administrative region)